The Piranha court case (Dutch: Piranhazaak) is a trial of an Islamist terror group — 'Piranha group' — which was a direct successor to the 2002-2004 Hofstadgroup.

Piranha case 
On December 1, 2006, the District Court of Rotterdam, sitting in 'de Bunker' in Amsterdam Nieuw-West, convicted Samir Azzouz of preparing a terrorist attack and sentenced him to 8 years in prison. Nouriddin El Fahtni and Mohammed Chentouf were sentenced to 4 years in prison, Soumaya Sahla was sentenced to 3 years in prison and Brahim Harhour was sentenced to 3 months in prison. The Court ruled that the six individuals had not formed a terrorist organization.

The defendants lodged appeal with the Court of Appeal in The Hague.

On 2 October 2008 the Court of Appeal sentenced all suspects to  higher sentences than those given by the District Court of Rotterdam: Samir Azzouz got 9 years in prison, Nouriddin El Fahtni got 8 years, Mohammed Chentouf got 6 years and Soumaya Sahla was sentenced to 4 years in prison.

Samir Azzouz was released on 6 September 2013. (On 31 August 2022 he  — and others — was convicted again for helping Dutch IS women to escape from camps in Syria. )

Piranha II case 
After the witnesses Lahbib B. and his wife Hanan S. had testified against the defendants in the Piranha case, they were prosecuted themselves. They were charged with participating in a terrorist organization, the preparation of attacks and the possession of several firearms. The District Court of Rotterdam sentenced them to 3 years in prison. The Court of Appeal in The Hague reduced these sentences to 104 days (Lahbib B.) and 74 days (Hanan S.).

Court rulings (Piranah case)

Court rulings (Piranah II case)

See also 
 Hofstad Network

Notes

References

 
Islamist groups
Organisations designated as terrorist by the European Union
Jihadist groups
Islamic terrorism in the Netherlands